Raja Maung Saw Pru (also spelt Mong Saw Pru) was a son of King Nanda Bayin and grandson of Bayinnaung. He was the 1st Governor of the Bohmong Circle (modern-day Bandarban District) from 1599 to 1631 appointed by Arakan king Min Razagyi during the Toungoo dynasty.

Biography
Maung Saw Pru is the first ruler of Bohmong Htaung who was the son of King Nanda Bayin of Pegu and grandson of Bayinnaung.

Role
In 1599, Min Razagyi, the King of Arakan led to the capitulation of Hanthawaddy Kingdom. Nanda Bayin, the King of Pegu was defeated and perished in the war. Daughter of Nanda Bayin, Princess Thien Daw Hnaung and minor Prince Maung Saw Prue were taken into Mrauk U Kingdom, the capital of Arakan, as captive along with other booties. Some 3000 families from Pegu followed the scion of their ruler and settled in Arakan.

The Arakanese King Min Razagyi appointed a Prince of Pegu Maung Saw Pru as the governor of newly established Bohmong Htaung (Circle) by giving the title of "Bohmong" Raja in 1599. Min Razagyi  married the Princess Khin Ma Hnaung and his son Khamaung appointed his uncle-in law Prince Maung Saw Pru as Governor of Chittagong in 1614.

In 1620, who repulsed the Portuguese invasion with extreme courage and valor, King Khamaung conferred the title "Bohmong" (means the Great General) to Maung Saw Pru. Ancestors of the present Bohmong dynasty were the successor of the Pegu King of Burma under the Arakan's rule in Chittagong. 

Bohmong Htaung is Now Bandarban District, Chittagong Division, South-Eastern Bangladesh. Bandarban Hill District was once called Bohmong Htaung since the Arakanese rule.

External links 
Bohmong Chief and King

References

Mrauk-U Kingdom
Rulers of Bengal
16th-century monarchs in Asia
17th-century monarchs in Asia